Norwegian singer and DJ Annie has released three studio albums, five mix albums, four extended plays, 25 singles (including five as a featured artist), and two additional promotional singles and eight music videos.

Albums

Studio albums

Mix albums

Extended plays

Singles

As lead artist

As featured artist

Promotional singles

Guest appearances

Music videos

References

External links 
 
 
 
 

Discographies of Norwegian artists
Electronic music discographies
Pop music discographies